Alistair Graeme Fox (born 1948 in Richmond, New Zealand) is a New Zealand scholar, former university administrator and writer who specialises in English Tudor literature and history, New Zealand literature and cinema studies, and contemporary literary and film theory.

Fox was educated at the University of Canterbury obtaining a master's degree in 1970. His masters thesis title was Religion and humanism in Sir Thomas More's Utopia.

He currently holds the title of professor emeritus at the University of Otago, Dunedin, New Zealand. Until his retirement in 2013, he held a Personal Chair in English Literature at this same university, where he also served as Pro-Vice Chancellor, Division of Humanities. His honors include the award of a Nuffield Visiting Fellowship, Claire Hall, Cambridge (1980–1981) and an appointment as visiting fellow, All Souls College, Oxford (1987-1988). Initially known for his scholarship on English Tudor literature, since 2008 he has turned to topics addressing New Zealand literature and culture, cinema studies, and theories of literary and cinematic representation. He has also translated a number of significant scholarly works from French into English, most recently Truffaut on Cinema, ed. Anne Gillain (Bloomington, IN: Indiana University Press, 2016).

His major published works have been highly praised within an international context, starting in 1983, when Sir Geoffrey Elton, then Regius Professor of Modern History at Clare College Cambridge, assessed Thomas More: History and Providence, concluding: ". . . this excellent book, which adds to the virtues of its substance a lucidity and readability not commonly found among literary or historical studies, provides the first solid basis on which further work can be undertaken. It will not surprise me if that further work will do little more than demonstrate the value of Dr. Fox's remarkable insights." Czech reviewer Jana Bébarová describes Fox's 2011 monograph Jane Campion: Authorship and Personal Cinema as "a remarkable and enriching perspective on the unique work of the most important woman director of her time," a view shared by Michel Ciment, editor of the French film journal Positif, who characterizes the volume as "remarquable."

Fox's work taken as a whole contributes to current debates about authorship and the creative process. Gabrielle Malcolm reviewing Jane Campion: Authorship and Personal Cinema proclaims that Fox "effectively announces the death of the intentional fallacy." Lars Bernaerts describes Speaking Pictures: Neuropsychoanalysis and Authorship in Film and Literature as "a distinct intervention" in "the field of cognitive cultural studies," noting that Fox's approach "combines psychoanalysis with neurocognitive science and integrates elements of reception theory and cultural studies" to inaugurate "a new synthesis."

Alistair Fox's major monographs include:
 Coming of Age in New Zealand: Genre, Gender and Adaptation in New Zealand Cinema (Edinburgh: Edinburgh University Press, 2017)  
 Speaking Pictures: Neuropsychoanalysis and Authorship in Film and Literature (Bloomington, IN: Indiana University Press, 2016) ;
 Jane Campion: Authorship and Personal Cinema (Bloomington, IN: Indiana University Press, 2011) ; 
 The Ship of Dreams: Masculinity in Contemporary New Zealand Fiction (Dunedin; Otago University Press, 2008) ;
 The English Renaissance: Identity and Representation in the Reign of Elizabeth I (Oxford: Basil Blackwell, 1997)  ;
 Utopia: An Elusive Vision, Twayne Masterworks (Boston: G.K. Hall, 1993) ; 
 Politics and Literature in the Reigns of Henry VII and Henry VIII (Oxford: Basil Blackwell, 1989) ; 
 Thomas More: History and Providence (Oxford: Basil Blackwell, 1982; New Haven: Yale University Press, 1983) .

References

External links 
University of Otago Department of English and Linguistics 

1948 births
Living people
Academic staff of the University of Otago
Fellows of All Souls College, Oxford
Fellows of Clare Hall, Cambridge
People from Richmond, New Zealand
University of Canterbury alumni